Derek Fordjour (born 1974) is an American interdisciplinary artist and educator of Ghanaian heritage, who works in collage, video/film, sculpture, and painting. Fordjour lives and works in New York City.

Early life and education 
Derek Fordjour was born 1974 in Memphis, Tennessee. His parents were both Ghanaian immigrants.

Fordjour received an MFA from Hunter College, an Ed. M in Arts Education from Harvard University, and a B.A. degree from Morehouse College. Fordjour is a member of Alpha Phi Alpha fraternity. He was commissioned by Alpha Phi Alpha to create a portrait entitled An Experiment in Brotherhood to commemorate the founding of the fraternity.

Career 
He was appointed the Alex Katz Chair at Cooper Union in Spring 2020, and since 2018 he serves as a Core Critic at Yale University School of Art. 

In 2014, Fordjour was working with sports imagery in his art, and which served as metaphors of inequality. 

In 2020, his series of artwork in the exhibition titled, "Shelter" were created during the self-quarantine period due to the COVID-19 pandemic. The works in "Shelter" examined the privilege of security, as well as confinement.

In 2021, the artist had a solo exhibition at Pond Society in Shanghai, China; where his paintings looked at the gamification of social structures and vulnerability. In these paintings, Fordjour incorporated layers of the Financial Times. On his use of the paper in his practice, Fordjour explained in Ocula Magazine: 'The Financial Times is making an effort to differentiate itself from the pool of other newsprint with its distinctive colour. The idea of individuation—the desire to distinguish oneself in the face of being stereotyped or grouped—has a tension that I identify with.'

His work has been exhibited in numerous venues including Contemporary Art Museum St. Louis (2020), Nasher Museum of Art (2019), and the Whitney Museum of Contemporary Art (2018–2019). He has received commissions for public projects including a permanent installation for Metropolitan Transit Authority of New York City at 145th Street Subway Station, and the Whitney Museum Billboard Project in 2018.

Personal life 
In July 2022, Fordjour married Alexis Hoag-Fordjour at the Arthur Ross Terrace and Garden at Cooper Hewitt, Smithsonian Design Museum in Manhattan.

Awards, honors, and collections 
He was awarded 2016 Sugarhill Museum Artist-in-Residence; the 2017 Sharpe Walentas Studio Program in New York City; and named the 2018 Deutsche Bank NYFA Fellowship Award.

His work appears in several public and private collections, including the Studio Museum in Harlem, Brooklyn Museum, Perez Museum, Dallas Museum of Art, the Whitney Museum, and Los Angeles County Museum of Art.

Select exhibitions
 2020 'SELF MUST DIE', Petzel Gallery, New York, NY
2020 'SHELTER', Contemporary Art Museum of St. Louis, St. Louis, MO
2019 'The House Always Wins', Josh Lilley, London, UK
2019 'JRRNNYS', Night Gallery, Los Angeles, CA
2018 'Half Mast', the Whitney Museum of American Art, New York, NY
2018 'Derek Fordjour: Camelot Study', BAM, Brooklyn, NY
2018 'Ritual', Nina Johnson Gallery, Miami, FL
2017 'PARADE', Sugar Hill Museum, New York, NY
2016 'Agency and Regulation', LUCE Gallery, Turin, Italy
 2016 'Eight Paintings', Papillion Art, Los Angeles, CA
 2015 'UPPER ROOM', Robert Blumenthal Gallery, New York, NY

Selected press and reviews
 Hyperallergic, "Derek Fordjour Conjures a Heavenly World", Seph Rodney, December 16, 2020
T: The New York Times Style Magazine, “Marching to…, T Magazine, November 27, 2020
New York Times, “Derek Fordjour, From Anguish…”, Siddhartha Mitter, November 19, 2020
ARTNews, “Best Practices: Derek Fordjour…”, Andy Battaglia, November 10, 2020
Financial Times, “Derek Fordjour on painting…”, Jackie Wullschläger, October 20, 2020
Elephant Magazine, “Derek Fordjour Uses Sport…”, Emily Steer, October 16, 2020
Artsy, “Derek Fordjour Honors Disenfranchised…”, Jacqui Germain, June 3, 2020
Financial Times, “Painting crowds, or the lack…”, Jackie Wullschläger, May 8, 2020
Hyperallergic, “Derek Fordjour Considers…”, Jack Radley, April 6, 2020
Artforum, “Critics Pick: Derek Fordjour: Shelter”, Jennifer Piejko, January 2020
St. Louis Post Dispatch, “Beyond white walls…”, Jane Henderson, January 17, 2020
Financial Times, “Four exhibitions bring African…”, Jackie Wullschlager, 2019
Artnews, “Petzel Gallery Now Represents Derek…”, Annie Armstrong, 2019
Galerie, “The rising-star artist uses imagery of carnivals…”, Lucy Rees, 2019
Cultured, “Artist Derek Fordjour Revels in The Game…”, Jennifer Piejko, 2019
Los Angeles Times, “Datebook: Paintings of…”, Carolina A. Miranda, 2019
The Wall Street Journal, “‘I Don’t Want to Be a Blip…”, Kelly Crow, 2019
Artnet News, “8 Art Advisors Tell Us Which Artists…”, Henri Neuendorf, 2018
Culture Type, “Historic Bequest: Late Arts…”, Victoria L. Valentine, Oct, 10 2018
Artnet News, “Price Check! Here’s What Sold…”, artnet News, October 9, 2018
Hyperallergic, “Studio Museum in Harlem…”, Jasmine Weber, October 8, 2018
Artnews, “Even as Brexit Looms, Galleries…”, Judd Tully, October 3, 2018
Gotham, “6 Innovators Shaping…”, The Editors, October 1, 2018
Juvenile Justice, “Arts-centered New York…”, Shay Urbani, May 25, 2018
Hyperallergic, “Wandering the Artists…”, Seph Rodney, May 5, 2018
Surface, “Best of Zona Maco 2018”, Brooke Porter Katz, February 11, 2018
Artsy, “What Sold at Zona Maco”, Anna Louie Sussman, February 11, 2018
Hyperallergic, “The Political Truths…”, Seph Rodney, February 9, 2018
The Art Newspaper, “Art Los…”, Maxwell Williams, January 31, 2018
Artnet News, “How Artist Derek Fordjour…”, Sarah Cascone, December 18, 2017
Hyperallergic, “A Dreamy Carnival…”, Seph Rodney, November 22, 2017
The Undefeated, “The Portrait of an Artist…”, Kelley D. Evans, October 6, 2017
Galerie Magazine, “Derek Fordjour’s Immersive…”, Jacqueline Terrebonne, August 2, 2017
Forbes, “The Jay-Z of the Art World Discusses His…”, Brienne Walsh, July 16, 2017
Vice, “Sports Are a Metaphor for Inequality…”, Francesca Capossela, June 21, 2017
Los Angeles Times, "And There is an End...", David Pagel, March 21, 2016
Los Angeles Times, “Derek Fordjour: Eight Paintings..” by Carolina Miranda, February 4, 2016
 Observer, "Nine Overachieving New Yorkers You Must Date", February 3, 2016
 New York Times, “From Derek Fordjour...” by Holland Cotter, November 19, 2015
 Los Angeles Times, “And There is an End..” by David Pagel, March 21, 2015
 The Brooklyn Rail, Review of ‘The Big Game’.. by Johnathan Goodman, October 7, 2014
 Ebony, “Artist Derek Fordjour has a Lesson for…”, by Souleo, September 29, 2014
Huffington Post, “The Sports World Could Learn...” by Souleo, 2014
MSNBC’s Thegrio.com, “40 Amazing Black Artists to Watch in 2014”, January 3, 2014

References

External links
 Pen's Eye: Interview With Artist Derek Fordjour (2014)

Harvard Graduate School of Education alumni
Morehouse College alumni
Living people
African-American artists
American artists
Interdisciplinary artists
1974 births
21st-century African-American people
20th-century African-American people